Kılıçdere is a village in the İskilip District of Çorum Province in Turkey. Its population is 325 (2022). The village is populated by Kurds and is the village of Naci Bostancı.

References

Villages in İskilip District
Kurdish settlements in Çorum Province